Frank Townsend Bow (February 20, 1901 – November 13, 1972) was a noted Ohio jurist and politician who served as a Republican Congressman in the United States House of Representatives from January 3, 1951, until his death from heart failure in Bethesda, Maryland on November 13, 1972.

Born in Canton, Ohio, Bow attended college at Ohio Northern University, where he was a member of the Sigma Pi fraternity, and law school at Columbia Law School. He was admitted to the Ohio bar in 1923 when he returned to Canton to practice law. The Frank T. Bow Federal Building and United States Courthouse in Canton, Ohio is named in his honor.

In 1929, Bow was appointed as assistant attorney general of the state. In 1932, he was hired by WHBC, a Canton area radio station.  During World War II, he worked as the station's overseas correspondent, traveling to cover the war in the Philippines.  During the Eightieth United States Congress, Bow was hired as part of the general counsel to the Expenditures Committee. Senator Andrew F. Schoeppel hired him as a legislative aide during the next Congress.

In 1950, Bow was elected to the House of Representatives.  He was a close ally of Dwight D. Eisenhower and a staunch supporter of tax reform. Bow voted in favor of the Civil Rights Acts of 1957, 1960, 1964, and 1968, but did not vote on the Voting Rights Act of 1965. In 1972, Bow announced his retirement from Congress and was set to become the next U.S. Ambassador to Panama after his congressional term ended having been confirmed September 8, but died of heart failure at Bethesda Naval Hospital on November 13, 1972, before he was sworn in.

See also
 List of United States Congress members who died in office (1950–99)

Sources

External links

1901 births
1972 deaths
Columbia Law School alumni
Republican Party members of the United States House of Representatives from Ohio
Ohio Northern University alumni
Ohio lawyers
Politicians from Canton, Ohio
Burials at West Lawn Cemetery
20th-century American lawyers
20th-century American politicians
Lawyers from Canton, Ohio
United States congressional aides